REN Media Group is a media company based in Moscow, Russia and established by Dmitry Lesnevsky. REN Media Group USA is the company's American arm and is also affiliated with Mini Movie Channel.

References 

Russian film websites
Mass media companies of Russia
Companies based in Moscow